Abdel Aziz Moussa may refer to:

 Abdel Bouckar (Abdel Aziz Boukar Moussa, born 1980), Angolan basketball center
 Abdel Aziz Moussa (footballer) (born 1989), Egyptian footballer